Alex Cross is a 2012 American action thriller film directed by Rob Cohen and starring Tyler Perry as the title character and Matthew Fox as the villain Picasso. The adapted screenplay was written by Marc Moss and Kerry Williamson. It is based on the 2006 novel Cross by James Patterson and is the third installment of the Alex Cross film series, which was considered as a reboot of the series. The title character was previously portrayed by Morgan Freeman in Kiss the Girls (1997) and Along Came a Spider (2001). Unlike the previous films, which were distributed by Paramount Pictures, the film was released by Lionsgate Films on October 19, 2012. It was panned by critics and audiences, and became a box office bomb, though Matthew Fox's performance received some praise

Plot
Dr. Alex Cross is a psychologist and police lieutenant who lives in Detroit with his wife Maria and their children. After learning Maria is pregnant, Cross considers accepting a job as an FBI profiler in Washington, D.C. Meanwhile, a man participates in an underground fighting match and seduces businesswoman Fan Yau. The man is invited to Yau's house, where he kills her after injecting her with TTX.

At the crime scene, Cross finds a charcoal sketch left behind by the killer in the style of the artist Picasso, leading to the murderer being nicknamed after him. While examining the sketch, Cross deduces that Picasso's next target is German businessman Erich Nunemarcher. Picasso attempts to kill Nunemarcher but is foiled by Cross, and escapes after being shot by Cross's partner Tommy Kane. Cross deduces that Picasso also plans to target billionaire CEO Giles Mercier.

As revenge for foiling his attack on Nunemarcher, Picasso attacks Cross and Kane's colleague, Monica Ashe, torturing her to death. Picasso then tracks down Cross, who is on a date with Maria, and kills her with a sniper rifle.

Picasso targets Nunemarcher and Mercier at a conference, killing Nunemarcher and seemingly Mercier. Cross and Kane track Picasso to the abandoned Michigan Theater. As Cross and Picasso fight, they fall through the crumbling theater ceiling. Cross kicks Picasso off the ceiling, killing him and avenging Maria. Kane helps pull Cross to safety.

Cross deduces Picasso's employer was Mercier himself. Having embezzled money from his clients, Mercier asked for Yau and Nunemarcher's help to fake his death and flee to Bali, then hired Picasso to eliminate them and a double pretending to be the real Mercier. After Cross frames Mercier for drug smuggling, Mercier is arrested in Indonesia, where he will be condemned to death by firing squad. Having avenged Maria's murder, Cross decides to accept the job offer from the FBI and moves to Washington with his family.

Cast

 Tyler Perry as Dr. / Detective Alex Cross
 Edward Burns as Detective Tommy Kane
 Matthew Fox as Michael 'The Butcher of Sligo' Sullivan / Picasso
 Jean Reno as Giles Mercier
 Carmen Ejogo as Maria Cross
 Cicely Tyson as Regina 'Nana Mama' Cross
 Rachel Nichols as Detective Monica Ashe
 John C. McGinley as Chief Richard Brookwell
 Werner Daehn as Erich Nunemacher 
 Yara Shahidi as Janelle Cross 
 Sayeed Shahidi as Damon Cross 
 Bonnie Bentley as Detective Jody Klebanoff
 Simenona Martinez as 'Pop-Pop' Jones
 Stephanie Jacobsen as Fan Yau Lee
 Giancarlo Esposito as Daramus Holiday 
 Ingo Rademacher as Ingo Sacks

Production
A reboot film about Alex Cross character began development in 2010, with a screenplay by Kerry Williamson and James Patterson. David Twohy was attached as director, and was set to rewrite the screenplay. In August, Idris Elba was cast as Cross.

Towards the end of 2010, QED International purchased the rights, and initial screenplay by Williamson and Patterson. By January 2011, Tyler Perry had replaced Elba in the starring role, and Cohen was hired as director. The production company, QED, set Marc Moss, who worked on the previous Alex Cross films, to refine the screenplay for Perry and Cohen. With a production budget of $35 million, filming began on August 8 in Cleveland, Ohio and lasted until September 16. Filming locations in northeast Ohio served as a backdrop to Detroit, Michigan, where the character works for the Detroit Police Department. After Ohio, filming also took place in Detroit itself for two weeks. The production office remained in Cleveland throughout production inside an empty portion of the old American Greetings Company Factory.

Summit Entertainment purchased domestic distribution rights in March 2011, and set the release date for October 26, 2012.

The theatrical release poster featured the tagline, "Don't ever cross Alex Cross", The Playlist at indieWire was critical of the tagline, saying that "it'll be impressive if anything dumber appears on a movie poster this year".

Reception

Box office
The film opened in 2,539 theaters in North America, grossing $11,396,768 during its first weekend, with an average of $4,489 per theater, and ranking #5 at the box office. The film ultimately earned $25,888,412 domestically and $8,730,455 internationally, for a total of $34,618,867, on a $35 million production budget.

Critical response
Alex Cross was widely panned by critics and audiences. The film holds an 11% approval rating on Rotten Tomatoes, based on 127 reviews, with an average rating of 3.6 out of 10. The critical consensus states: "Tyler Perry and Matthew Fox did their best, but they're trampled by Rob Cohen's frustrating direction and a tasteless, lazily written screenplay". At Metacritic, the film received a score of 30 out of 100, based on 34 reviews. Audiences, however, gave Alex Cross an "A" CinemaScore. The film earned a Razzie Award nomination for Perry as Worst Actor.

Cancelled sequel
Prior to the film's release, Double Cross was scheduled to be adapted into a film, with Perry reprising his role, but the sequel was cancelled, following the critical and commercial failure of Alex Cross.

References

External links
 
 

Alex Cross (novel series)
2012 films
2012 crime thriller films
2010s mystery thriller films
American action thriller films
American crime thriller films
American mystery thriller films
American serial killer films
American films about revenge
Reboot films
Films directed by Rob Cohen
Films based on American novels
Films based on crime novels
Films based on works by James Patterson
Films set in Detroit
Films shot in Cleveland
Films shot in Indonesia
Summit Entertainment films
Lionsgate films
Fictional portrayals of the Detroit Police Department
QED International films
MoviePass Films films
Films scored by John Debney
Films produced by Bill Block
Films shot in Detroit
2010s English-language films
2010s American films
African-American films